Marisa Anna Solinas (30 May 1939 – 12 February 2019), best known as  Marisa Solinas, was an Italian actress and singer.

Life
Born in Genoa to a Sardinian father and a Tuscan mother from Garfagnana, Marisa Solinas made her film debut in 1961, but her career was launched the following year when she was chosen by Mario Monicelli to be the main actress in "Renzo e Luciana", one of the four episodes of Boccaccio '70; the same year she appeared in Bernardo Bertolucci's film debut, La commare secca and acted on stage in Fogli d'album at the Festival dei Due Mondi. Later she starred in a large number of genre films, especially Spaghetti Westerns, and appeared in several successful TV-series.

She was also a singer, and published two albums and several singles, one of these released by La voce del padrone.

She died on 12 February 2019, at the age of 79.

References

External links
 
 Marisa Solinas at Discogs

1939 births
2019 deaths
Italian film actresses
Musicians from Genoa
Italian women singers
Italian television actresses
20th-century Italian actresses
Spaghetti Western actresses
Actors from Genoa